Montana City is an unincorporated community and census-designated place (CDP) in Jefferson County, Montana, United States. The population was 2,715 at the 2010 census, up from 2,094 in 2000. It is part of the Helena Micropolitan Statistical Area.

History
Montana City is located on top of one of the oldest prehistoric sites in the state of Montana. As early as 9,000 BCE, Native Americans came to Montana City to collect chert, a rock similar to flint, which was used to make spear tips, arrowheads, and knives. White American explorers discovered gold at the site on July 2, 1862, and later that year U.S. Army Captain Jason L. Fisk brought a mule train from Minnesota which stopped at the site and built the first houses that became Montana City. The town became one of the most important mining centers in Montana during the height of the gold rush in the 1860s. The Montana Town Company laid out the city in 1864, naming it after the territory's new name. Chinese miners took over from whites when the mines began to play out in 1868, and the town saw a brief revival after the arrival of the railroads and the establishment of a post office in the 1880s. At its height in the 1880s, Montana City had 3,000 residents and competed for the location of the state capital.

Montana City was almost a ghost town for most of the 20th century until the Permanente Cement Company built a cement manufacturing plant there in 1940. Today, Montana City is a bedroom community serving Helena.

Geography
Montana City is located in northern Jefferson County at  (46.537357, -111.931705). It is bordered to the northwest by unincorporated South Hills, to the northeast by the town of East Helena in Lewis and Clark County, and to the south by unincorporated Clancy.

Interstate 15 passes through Montana City, with access from Exit 187. I-15 leads north  to Helena, the state capital, and south  to Boulder, the Jefferson county seat.

Prickly Pear Creek, a tributary of the Missouri River, flows northward through the community.

Demographics

As of the census of 2010, there were 2,715 people in Montana City, a 30% increase over the 2000 census. Of the 2,094 people of the 2000 census, 697 households, and 627 families residing in the CDP. The population density was 74.2 people per square mile (28.6/km). There were 709 housing units at an average density of 25.1/sq mi (9.7/km). The racial makeup of the CDP was 98.19% White, 0.05% African American, 0.48% Native American, 0.10% Asian, 0.14% Pacific Islander, 0.10% from other races, and 0.96% from two or more races. Hispanic or Latino of any race were 1.10% of the population.

There were 697 households, out of which 46.1% had children under the age of 18 living with them, 84.4% were married couples living together, 2.9% had a female householder with no husband present, and 9.9% were non-families. 7.5% of all households were made up of individuals, and 2.3% had someone living alone who was 65 years of age or older. The average household size was 2.99 and the average family size was 3.14.

In the CDP, the population was spread out, with 30.9% under the age of 18, 4.7% from 18 to 24, 28.2% from 25 to 44, 29.4% from 45 to 64, and 6.7% who were 65 years of age or older. The median age was 39 years. For every 100 females, there were 98.5 males. For every 100 females age 18 and over, there were 101.5 males.

The median income for a household in the CDP was $66,027, and the median income for a family was $67,240. Males had a median income of $40,909 versus $29,508 for females. The per capita income for the CDP was $21,774. About 3.5% of families and 4.0% of the population were below the poverty line, including 4.3% of those under age 18 and 11.3% of those age 65 or over.

Education
Jefferson High School in Boulder serves the Montana City students.

The North Jefferson County Library has a location in Montana City.

References

External links
 Montana City Volunteer Fire Department

Census-designated places in Jefferson County, Montana
Census-designated places in Montana
Helena, Montana micropolitan area
1864 establishments in Dakota Territory